The forests of Canada are located across much of the country. Over 90% of Canada's forests are owned by the public (Crown land land and Provincial forest). About half of the forests are allocated for logging.

Named forests are found within eight distinct regions. These forests may also be part of ecosystems, a number of which extend south into the United States. For example, the Northern hardwood forest is an ecosystem located in large areas of southeastern and south central Canada as well as in Ontario and Quebec. This system extends south to west and even into the United States.

Canada had a 2018 Forest Landscape Integrity Index mean score of 8.99/10, ranking it 11th globally out of 172 countries.

Ontario alone, makes up for 20% of Canada's Forests, which makes roughly 2% of the forests in the world. Ontario follows strict laws and regulations to manage its forests in a sustainable way. Ontario Forests are mainly managed by the Ministry of Northern Development, Mines, Natural Resources and Forestry (NDMNRF). They ensure a fair trade between sustaining the forest, while protecting the biodiversity of the ecosystem and providing legal methods for harvesting to benefit the economy.

Regions

The forests of Canada are located within eight regions:

Acadian Forest Region - This region comprises a temperate broadleaf and mixed forest ecoregion located in Quebec as well as the Maritime Provinces in Eastern Canada, and extends into the United States.
Boreal Forest Region - This the largest forest region in Canada. It is located in the north and contains about one third of the world's circumpolar boreal forests.
Coast Forest Region - Located on the west coast, this region almost entirely comprises coniferous trees including the Douglas-fir, Sitka spruce, western hemlock, and western red cedar.
Columbia Forest Region - Also mostly comprising coniferous trees, this region is located between the Rocky Mountains and the central plateau in British Columbia.
Deciduous Forest Region - This region is located between Lake Huron, Lake Ontario, and Lake Erie in southwestern Ontario.
Great Lakes-St. Lawrence Forest - This region is the second largest (the boreal being the largest), and is located from southeastern Manitoba to the Gaspé Peninsula.
Montane Forest Region - Located in the west of Canada, this region covers parts of the Kootenays, the central plateau of British Columbia, and a number of valleys close to Alberta's border.
Subalpine Forest Region - This region is located in British Columbia and Alberta. It covers the Rocky Mountains from the west coast Alberta's uplands.

By Province

The following is a list of forests, ecoregions, ecozones, forested parklands and provincial parks.

Alberta

Alberta Mountain forests
Alberta-British Columbia foothills forests
Aspen parkland
Mid-Continental Canadian forests
Muskwa-Slave Lake forests
North Central Rockies forest

British Columbia

Alberta-British Columbia foothills forests
Aspen parkland
British Columbia mainland coastal forests
Cascade Mountains leeward forests
Elkington Forest
Fraser Plateau and Basin complex
Great Bear Rainforest
Inland rainforest
Lower Mainland Ecoregion
Malcolm Knapp Research Forest
Muskwa-Slave Lake forests
North Central Rockies forest
Northern Pacific coastal forests
Pacific temperate rainforests

Manitoba

Agassiz Provincial Forest
Belair Provincial Forest
Brightstone Sand Hill Provincial Forest
Cat Hills Provincial Forest
Cormorant Provincial Forest
Duck Mountain Provincial Forest
Mid-Continental Canadian forests

Midwestern Canadian Shield forests
Moose Creek Provincial Forest
Northwest Angle Provincial Forest
Porcupine Provincial Forest
Provincial forests
Sandilands Provincial Forest
Spruce Woods Provincial Forest
Swan-Pelican Provincial Forest
Tallgrass Aspen Parkland
Turtle Mountain Provincial Forest
Wampum Provincial Forest
Whiteshell Provincial Forest

Newfoundland
Newfoundland Highland forests

Nova Scotia
Ben Eoin Provincial Park

Ontario

Barker's Bush
Carolinian forest
Central Canadian Shield forests
Crothers Woods
Eastern Great Lakes lowland forests
Ganaraska Region
Haliburton Forest
Happy Valley Forest
John E. Pearce Provincial Park
Larose Forest
Laurentian Mixed Forest Province
Long Point, Ontario
Midwestern Canadian Shield forests
Mixed Wood Plains Ecozone (CEC)
Niagara Glen Nature Reserve
Obabika Old-Growth Forest
Pinery Provincial Park
Point Pelee National Park
Rock Glen Conservation Area
Rock Point Provincial Park
Rondeau Provincial Park
Short Hills Provincial Park
Southwest Elgin Forest Complex
Western Great Lakes forests
Wheatley Provincial Park

Prince Edward Island
Beach Grove Memorial Forest
Strathgartney Woodlands

Quebec

Angell Woods
Bois Beckett Forest
Central Canadian Shield forests
Eastern Canadian forests
Eastern Canadian Shield taiga
Eastern Great Lakes lowland forests
Great North Woods
Laurentian Mixed Forest Province
Mixed Wood Plains Ecozone (CEC)

Saskatchewan

 Canwood Provincial Forest
 Fort à la Corne Provincial Forest
 Nisbet Provincial Forest
 Northern Provincial Forest
 Porcupine Provincial Forest
 Torch River Provincial Forest

Yukon
Yukon Interior dry forests

Other forest areas

Northern hardwood forest
Northwoods (forest)

Temperate broadleaf and mixed forests
Beech-maple forest - This forest is located mostly in eastern United States and extends into southern Canada. 
Carolinian forest
Eastern forest-boreal transition
Eastern Great Lakes lowland forests
John E. Pearce Provincial Park
Long Point, Ontario
Niagara Glen Nature Reserve
Northern hardwood forest
Pinery Provincial Park
Point Pelee National Park
Rock Point Provincial Park
Rondeau Provincial Park
Short Hills Provincial Park
Southwest Elgin Forest Complex
Western Great Lakes forests
Wheatley Provincial Park

See also
Forest cover by province or territory in Canada
List of countries by forest area

References

External links